Judith Cohen may refer to:

 Judy Chicago (born 1939), born Judith Cohen, American feminist artist, art educator, and writer
 Judith Gamora Cohen (born 1946), astronomer and professor
 Judith Love Cohen (1933–2016), American aerospace engineer and author
 Judith R. Cohen (born 1949), Canadian ethnomusicologist
 Judith Solomon Cohen (1766–1837), matriarch of one of the earliest Jewish families in Baltimore, Maryland
 Judith Cohen, birth name of Judith Montefiore (1784–1862), British linguist, musician, travel writer, and philanthropist